We Try is a song of the American singer Chris Medina. Medina performed with the song in Melodi Grand Prix 2019 but didn't get into the final.

References 

2019 songs
Melodi Grand Prix songs of 2019